The Bayer designation Omega Aquarii (ω Aqr / ω Aquarii) is shared by two star systems, in the constellation Aquarius:
 ω1 Aquarii (102 Aquarii)
 ω2 Aquarii (105 Aquarii)
They are separated by 0.78° on the sky.

All of them were member of asterism 羽林軍 (Yǔ Lín Jūn), Palace Guard, Encampment mansion.

References

Aquarii, Omega
Aquarius (constellation)